Cape Green is a low ice cliff forming the southeastern extremity of Tabarin Peninsula, on the northeast end of the Antarctic Peninsula. It was charted by the Falkland Islands Dependencies Survey (FIDS) in 1946 and named for Michael C. Green, a FIDS geologist who lost his life when the base hut at Hope Bay burned in November 1948. Neighbouring Cape Burd commemorates Oliver Burd, a FIDS meteorologist who lost his life in the same fire.

References

Headlands of Trinity Peninsula